Radium Hot Springs, informally and commonly called Radium, is a village of 1,339 residents situated in the East Kootenay region of British Columbia. The village is named for the hot springs located in the nearby Kootenay National Park. From Banff, Alberta, it is accessible via Highway 93.

The hot springs were named after the radioactive element when an analysis of the water showed that it contained small traces of radon which is a decay product of radium.

Geography

Radium is located 16 km north of the tourist town of Invermere, and 105 km south of Golden, British Columbia. It is located at the junction of  Highway 95 and Highway 93, in the Columbia River valley, between the river and Kootenay National Park.

Wildlife in the area includes mule deer, grizzly bears, black bears, mountain goats and Rocky Mountain bighorn sheep.

Demographics 

Amenities

Several golf courses are located nearby, along with 675 hotel and motel rooms.

Kootenay National Park
The southwestern entrance to Kootenay National Park is located immediately east of the village limits, with Highway 93 leading into the park lined with motels.

Hot springs

References

External links

Hot springs of British Columbia
Populated places in the Regional District of East Kootenay
British Columbia populated places on the Columbia River
Villages in British Columbia